There is also Garden City in Wayne County. 

Garden is a village in Delta County of the U.S. state of Michigan.  The population was 221 at the 2010 census. The village is located within Garden Township.

M-183 runs through the village, connecting with Fayette eight miles (13 km) southwest and with U.S. Highway 2 at Garden Corners, nine miles (14 km) to the north.

History
When this area was first settled around 1850 by Metis it was known as Garden Bay or Haley's Bay.  It was incorporated as a village in 1886.

Geography
The village is situated on the Garden Peninsula where the Garden Creek flows into Garden Bay, a small inlet off the Big Bay de Noc, which opens onto Green Bay, on Lake Michigan.

Demographics

2010 census
As of the census of 2010, there were 221 people, 99 households, and 63 families living in the village. The racial makeup of the village was 87.3% White, 5.0% Native American, and 7.7% from two or more races. Hispanic or Latino of any race were 0.5% of the population.

There were 99 households, of which 26.3% had children under the age of 18 living with them, 47.5% were married couples living together, 7.1% had a female householder with no husband present, 9.1% had a male householder with no wife present, and 36.4% were non-families. 31.3% of all households were made up of individuals, and 14.1% had someone living alone who was 65 years of age or older. The average household size was 2.21 and the average family size was 2.65.

The median age in the village was 49.4 years. 21.3% of residents were under the age of 18; 4.9% were between the ages of 18 and 24; 16.7% were from 25 to 44; 34.8% were from 45 to 64; and 22.2% were 65 years of age or older. The gender makeup of the village was 52.0% male and 48.0% female.

2000 census
As of the census of 2000, there were 240 people, 104 households, and 74 families living in the village. The racial makeup of the village was 80.42% White, 8.75% Native American, and 10.83% from two or more races.

There were 104 households, out of which 27.9% had children under the age of 18 living with them, 59.6% were married couples living together, 4.8% had a female householder with no husband present, and 28.8% were non-families. 25.0% of all households were made up of individuals, and 17.3% had someone living alone who was 65 years of age or older.  The average household size was 2.31 and the average family size was 2.70.

In the village, the population was spread out, with 24.2% under the age of 18, 3.3% from 18 to 24, 22.5% from 25 to 44, 28.3% from 45 to 64, and 21.7% who were 65 years of age or older.  The median age was 45 years. For every 100 females, there were 96.7 males.  For every 100 females age 18 and over, there were 93.6 males.

The median income for a household in the village was $36,250, and the median income for a family was $46,500. Males had a median income of $36,875 versus $30,469 for females. The per capita income for the village was $16,605.  About 3.0% of families and 7.6% of the population were below the poverty line, including 14.8% of those under the age of eighteen and 13.2% of those 65 or over.

Climate
This climatic region is typified by large seasonal temperature differences, with warm to hot (and often humid) summers and cold (sometimes severely cold) winters.  According to the Köppen Climate Classification system, Garden has a humid continental climate, abbreviated "Dfb" on climate maps.

Notable people 
These notable people were born in Garden, Michigan.
 John B. Bennett
 James D. Dotsch
  Kellyn Potvin-Gorman

References

Notes

Sources

Villages in Delta County, Michigan
Villages in Michigan
1886 establishments in Michigan
Michigan populated places on Lake Michigan